Colin Rosslyn Dunnage (10 October 1896 – 7 November 1969) was an Australian politician who represented the South Australian House of Assembly seat of Unley from 1941 to 1962 for the Liberal and Country League.

References

 

Members of the South Australian House of Assembly
1896 births
1969 deaths
Liberal and Country League politicians
20th-century Australian politicians